The International Office of Public Hygiene, also known by its French name as the Office International d'Hygiène Publique and abbreviated as OIHP, was an international organization founded 9 December 1907 and based in Paris, France. It merged onto the World Health Organization after World War II.

History 
It was created to oversee international rules regarding the quarantining of ships and ports to prevent the spread of plague and cholera, and to administer other public health conventions, leading to engage on other epidemics, and the collection of broader epidemiological data on various diseases, as well as issues such as the control of medicinal opium, cannabis, and other drugs, the traumas created by World War I, etc.

The OIHP was part of the complex structure known as the Health Organization of the League of Nations, in an often-competing, and sometimes collaborative relation with the League of Nations' Health Committee.

The OIHP was dissolved by protocols signed 22 July 1946 and its epidemiological service was incorporated into the Interim Commission of the World Health Organization on 1 January 1947. However, the OIHP remained in existence legally until 1952.

Organisation 
The OIHP was managed by a "Permanent Committee" chaired successively by Rocco Santoliquido (1908-1919), Oscar Velghe (1919-1932), George S. Buchanan (1932-1936). Important personalities were taking part in the work of the OIHP such as Camille Barrère.

As of 1933, the OIHP was composed of the following contracting parties:
 , 1910
 , 1909
  Belgian Congo, 1927
 , 1907
 , 1912
 , 1907
  British dominions, 1927
  British India, 1908
 , 1909
 , 1910
 , 1912
 , 1913
  (Dutch Indies), 1925
 , 1907
 , 1907
  French Algeria, 1910
  French Equatorial Africa, 1929
  French Indochina, 1914
  French West Africa, 1920
 , 1928
  (Great Britain), 1907
 , 1913
  Kingdom of Hejaz, 1932
  (Irish Free State), 1928
 , 1907
 , 1924
 , 1926
 , 1920
 , 1920
 , 1909
 , 1913
 , 1907
 , 1912
 , 1924
 , 1908
 , 1909
 , 1920
 , 1907
 , 1921
 , 1926
 , 1909
 
 , 1922
  Union of South Africa, 1919
 , 1907
  French protectorate of Tunisia, 1908
 , 1911
 , 1907
 , 1913

See also 
 International Sanitary Conferences
 League of Nations
 Hygiene
 Public health
 World Health Organization
 Camille Barrère
 Drug Supervisory Body

References

International medical and health organizations
Organizations based in Paris
Organizations established in 1907
Organizations disestablished in 1946